Corruption in Nepal is widespread and extends to every sector from the government to the judiciary, police, health services, and education. Nepal ranks at 117 in Transparency International's 2021 Corruption Perceptions Index, unchanged from its 2020 ranking. The Corruption Perceptions Index ranks 180 countries by the degree of perceived corruption in the public sector; the country whose public sector is perceived to be most honest is ranked first.

Notable scandals 

 OMNI scandal – for "controversial procurement deal of medical supplies".
 Tax Settlement Commission scandal  – for corruption of 10.02 billion Nepalese rupees (NPR).

See also
 Commission for the Investigation of Abuse of Authority

References 

Nepal
Nepal
 
Crime in Nepal by type
Corruption
Government of Nepal
Law of Nepal
Society of Nepal
Politics of Nepal
Social issues in Nepal